The following is a list of California locations by income.

California had a per capita income of $29,906 during the five-year period comprising years 2010 through 2014. About every third county and every third place in California had per capita incomes above the state average. Though somewhat counterintuitive, this implies that counties and places with per capita incomes even slightly exceeding that of the state can be classified as "high income" given the natural division of places into a top third (high), middle third (medium), and lower third (low) when ranked by per capita income. Hence, the upper third of all places in this ranking have a per capita income with a lower bound roughly equal to that of the state, about $30,000. The median place and county in California had a per capita income of roughly $25,000, and the lower third of both types of geographies had per capita incomes with an upper bound of about $20,000. Places and counties with the highest per capita income were concentrated in the San Francisco Bay Area, which has a relatively high cost of living. Those with the lowest per capita incomes were concentrated in the Central Valley, an economy in which agriculture assumes a primary role.

Entire state

Counties 

The average population of counties with per capita incomes above the state's was twice as high (921,098) as those with a per capita income below the state average (546,543). Even this difference is minuscule when population density is considered: Counties with a per capita income above that of the state were eight times as dense on average (1,540.2 persons per square mile) than those with per capita income below that of the state (192.1 persons per square mile).

Marin County had by far the highest per capita income during that period ($58,004); its per capita income was almost $10,000 higher than San Francisco County, which ranked second in that regard. Of the ten counties in California with the highest per capita income, all but Orange were in Northern California, and all but three are located in the San Francisco Bay Area. Of the three not located there, two are smaller counties located in the Sacramento metropolitan area. Orange County's per capita income ranks last among these ten, and its per capita income is about $5,000 more than that of the state.

Seven of the ten counties in California with the lowest per capita incomes are located in the Central Valley. Two of the remaining three are rural counties in Northern California. This leaves Imperial County, which shares California's portion of the U.S.-Mexico border with San Diego County. All of these counties had populations not exceeding 1,000,000, and all of them are landlocked, with the exception of Del Norte County.

Of counties with a population exceeding 1,000,000, Santa Clara County had the highest per capita income ($42,666), followed by Contra Costa County ($38,770). San Diego ($31,043), Los Angeles ($27,987), and Sacramento ($27,071) counties all had per capita incomes near that of the state.

Places 

California places were unlike counties insofar as places with per capita incomes below and above the state average had about the same average population and population density. Like counties however, the lowest-income places tended to be located in the Central Valley, and the highest-income places were concentrated in the San Francisco Bay Area.

San Francisco is an extreme example of a place in California with both a large population (829,072) and high per capita income ($49,986). In fact, it has the highest per capita income of all places in California with a population of over 100,000. Though Sunnyvale ($48,203), San Mateo ($46,782), Thousand Oaks ($46,231), and Carlsbad ($44,305) join San Francisco to make up the top five places in California with the highest per capita income in that population class, none of them have populations even close to San Francisco. The next place with a population similar to that of San Francisco that appears in the per capita income rankings is San Jose ($34,992), and at this point, the difference in per capita income with the entire state of California is only about $5,000.

Seven of the ten places with the lowest per capita income and a population of over 50,000 were in Los Angeles County, and East Los Angeles has the highest population among them (127,610).

See also 

 California
 California locations by crime rate
 California locations by race
 California locations by voter registration
 Economy of California
 Economy of the United States
 List of U.S. states by income

Notes

References 

United States locations by per capita income
Locations by income
Income
Economy of the United States-related lists
Income